Agustín Pavó (born May 28, 1962) is a retired male track and field athlete from Cuba who competed in the sprint events during his career. He won the gold medal in the men's 4 × 400 metres relay at the 1991 Pan American Games, alongside teammates Héctor Herrera, Jorge Valentin and Lázaro Martínez.

References
 

1962 births
Living people
Cuban male sprinters
World Athletics Championships medalists
Pan American Games medalists in athletics (track and field)
Pan American Games gold medalists for Cuba
Pan American Games silver medalists for Cuba
Pan American Games bronze medalists for Cuba
Athletes (track and field) at the 1983 Pan American Games
Athletes (track and field) at the 1987 Pan American Games
Athletes (track and field) at the 1991 Pan American Games
World Athletics Championships athletes for Cuba
Central American and Caribbean Games gold medalists for Cuba
Competitors at the 1982 Central American and Caribbean Games
Competitors at the 1986 Central American and Caribbean Games
Central American and Caribbean Games medalists in athletics
Medalists at the 1983 Pan American Games
Medalists at the 1987 Pan American Games
Medalists at the 1991 Pan American Games
20th-century Cuban people